Henderson Investment Limited, the subsidiary company of Henderson Land Development, involves the development, investment and leasing of the properties in Hong Kong and Mainland China. Other activities include operations and management of department stores, investment in infrastructure projects, provision of cleaning and security guard services, and other investment holdings.

History
1970: Henderson Investment was established in 1970, named Wing Tai Development Limited.

1972: It was listed on the Hong Kong Stock Exchange.

1975: Lee Shau Kee, the founder of Henderson Land Development, took control of Wing Tai.

1985: Henderson acquired control of Wing Tai, and was renamed as Henderson Investment Limited.

1988: Henderson Land spun off its other holdings and investments, which were placed into Henderson Investment.

1989: It established its department store chain, Citistore.

1992: It acquired Miramar Hotel in Kowloon.

1995: It established a security management company, Megastrength Security Services Company.

1996: It established its property management company, Well Born Real Estate Management.

1996–2005: It was one of the Hang Seng Index Constituent Stocks (blue-chip stock).

2000: It moved into the information technology sectors through a subsidiary, Henderson Cyber.

2007: Henderson Land acquired assets from Henderson Investment, mainly consisting of the stakes of Hong Kong Ferry (Holdings) Company Limited and Miramar Hotel and Investment, and later Hong Kong and China Gas.

2018: Henderson Land acquired assets from UNY (HK) Limited department store chain, UNY

References

External links
Henderson Investment Limited

Companies listed on the Hong Kong Stock Exchange
Conglomerate companies of China
Real estate companies established in 1970
Henderson Land Development
Former companies in the Hang Seng Index
Conglomerate companies of Hong Kong
1970 establishments in Hong Kong